Uncanny Valley is the second full-length album by the Raleigh, NC-based rock band Birds of Avalon. The album was released by Volcom Entertainment on June 23, 2009.

Track listing
 "Unkaany Valley" 0:23
 "Side Two" 1:56
 "I Never Knew" 2:44
 "Your Downtime Is Up" 4:25
 "Dadcage" 2:06
 "Eyesore" 2:47
 "Student Teaching" 2:24
 "Spirit Lawyer" 3:04
 "Last Rites (Funky Slide)" 3:16
 "Peregrinations" 3:06
 "Micro-Infinity" 5:10

References

2009 albums
Birds of Avalon albums
Volcom Entertainment albums